Kopylov and Kopylova (feminine) is a common Russian surname.

It may refer to:

People
Abbakum Kopylov (1756–1838), founder of the postniki sect
Alexander Kopylov (1854–1911), Russian composer and violinist
Andrei Kopylov, mixed martial arts fighter
Andrei Nikolayevich Kopylov (born 1972), Russian footballer
Nikolai Georgiyevich Kopilov (1919–1995),  a Russian chess player
 (1928–2000), Soviet astronomer, the director of the Special Astrophysical Observatory in 1966–1985
Sergei Kopylov (born 1960), Soviet cyclist
Vadym Kopylov (born 1958), Ukrainian statesman
Vladimir Kopylov (1947–2006), Soviet and Russian physicist
Lilia Kopylova (born 1978), English professional dancer

Places
Kopylov (village), a village (khutor) in Saratov Oblast, Russia
Kopylova (village), a village in Tyumen Oblast, Russia

See also
9932 Kopylov, a main belt asteroid named after Ivan Kopylov

Russian-language surnames